Dick vs Dom is a live comedy entertainment stage show devised by Dick and Dom. The show was originally created for Butlins holiday resorts. They headlined the 2014, 2016, and 2020 seasons. (2020 was cut short due to COVID-19)

On 29 December 2016, it was announced via Dick and Dom's official Twitter account that Dick vs Dom would go on its first full UK tour in 2017. On 31 January 2017, the full details of the tour were announced via Dick and Dom's official Twitter account and the Dick and Dom official website, The tour began on 10 April 2017, and end on 29 October 2017, and ran for 22 shows.

In 2018, they performed to sell-out audiences and received 5-star reviews at the Edinburgh Festival. They also won the BroadwayWorld Best family show award. The show was also performed as a 'late night' version for a Millennial audience which was also a sell-out.

In 2019, the show headline the May half term at Eden Project in Cornwall. The show was such a success that queues formed and there were traffic jams in the St Austell area. In 2019, they also embarked on a tour with P&O Cruises.

Dick and Dom have taken the festival version of the show to many family festivals including Camp Bestival, The Big Feastival, CarFest, The Great Wonderfest, Jimmy's Festival, Chalfest, Wychwood, Standon Calling, Hay Festival and BST in Hyde Park. At festivals, they either perform Dick vs Dom, host the main stage or DJ in the Silent Disco or on the main stage with their new spin-off show Dick vs Dom DJ Battle.

Tour overview

 Due to popular demand at Butlins, Dick and Dom did two shows per holiday doubling the shows from 19 to 38, one in the afternoon and one in the evening, allowing more people to watch the show since Centre Stage can only hold 3000 people.

Games/ Items 
This is a list of games/items from Dick vs Dom.

References

Butlins
Comedy events
Entertainment events in the United Kingdom
Variety shows